Andrei Grigoryevich Chickin (born 12 October 1977) is a Russian football coach and a former player. He played as a goalkeeper. He works as goalkeeping coach with FC Mordovia Saransk.

International career
Chichkin made his debut for Russia on 18 November 1998 in a friendly against Brazil. He was called up to the team again a few years later but never came off the bench backing up Sergei Ovchinnikov and Ruslan Nigmatullin.

References
  Profile

1977 births
Living people
Russian footballers
Russia under-21 international footballers
Russia international footballers
FC Rotor Volgograd players
PFC Krylia Sovetov Samara players
FC Rostov players
Association football goalkeepers
FC Khimki players
FC Luch Vladivostok players
Russian Premier League players
FC Metallurg Lipetsk players
FC Sever Murmansk players